Levenson is a surname. It may be a variant of the Scottish surname Livingstone. The Livingstone are a Scottish branch of the Irish Dunleavy/MacNulty royals. Levenson (and Levinson, Levinsohn, etc.) may also be a Jewish surname, meaning "son of Levi" - referring to one of the twelve tribes in Israel. Levenson may refer to:

 Arthur Levenson, cryptographer who worked at Bletchley Park during World War II
 Barry Levenson, American blues musician and record producer
 Barton Paul Levenson (born 1960), American science fiction writer
 Boris Levenson (1884-1947), Romanian composer
 Claude B. Levenson (1938–2010), French journalist and writer
 Dan Levenson (artist), Contemporary artist
 Dan Levenson (musician), American musician and storyteller
 Ellie Levenson, British journalist
 Emanuel Levenson (1916-1998), American classical musician
 Fredrick Levenson (1945—2012), US author and psychoanalyst
 Gavan Levenson (born 1953), South African golfer
 Jeanine Levenson, known as Jeanine Tesori, composer of musicals
 Jon D. Levenson, Albert A List Professor of Jewish Studies, Harvard University
 Joseph R. Levenson (1920–1969), US-American historian
 Mark Levenson, musical director
 Sam Levenson (1911-1980), American humorist, writer, television host and journalist
 Thomas Levenson, American science writer and academic

See also
 MacDunleavy (dynasty)
 Levinson

References

 

Surnames of Scottish origin
Jewish surnames
Levite surnames
Yiddish-language surnames